Hellinsia thor is a moth of the family Pterophoridae. It is found in North America, including Colorado.

The wingspan is 22 mm. The forewings are deep fawn-brown with a few scattered black scales, most prominent along the inner margin of the second lobe. There are also a few whitish scales along the costa, and the lower edge of the first lobe is rather prominently white-scaled. The hindwings are deep smoky with similarly colored fringes.

References

Moths described in 1939
thor
Moths of North America
Taxa named by James Halliday McDunnough